Engman is a surname. Notable people with the surname include:

Adelina Engman (born 1994), Finnish footballer
Andy Engman (1911–2004), Swedish/Finnish animator
Carolina Engman (born 1987), Swedish blogger
Harald Engman (1903-1968), Danish painter
Helena Engman (born 1976), Swedish shot putter
Mats Engman (born 1954), Swedish Air Force major general
Max Engman (born 1945), Finnish historian and translator
Peter Engman (born 1963), Swedish actor
Robert Engman (born 1927), American sculptor